Catherine Ashcroft (born 8 April 1988) is an English musician (Irish Folk). She was born in Halifax.

Career 

She is a self-taught musician who plays the Uilleann pipes and whistles.

In 2008 Ashcroft recorded her first CD "Take Flight and Follow" at Stenkrith Studios in Kirkby Stephen. Here she met Belfast's singer, songwriter and multi-instrumentalist Maurice Dickson. The pair soon formed the duo "Mochara" (Irish for "my friend") and have since performed Celtic music throughout Britain and Europe. Together Ashcroft and Dickson have published three albums: "In Your Blood" in 2010, "Spirits and Dreamers" in 2013 and "Live at the Island" in 2015.

Ashcroft participated in Riverdance's China tour in 2017/2018.

References

External links 

Living people
21st-century English musicians
Irish folk musicians
21st-century English women musicians
Celtic folk musicians
1988 births